The 1994–95 French Rugby Union Championship was played by 32 clubs, divided into 4 pools. After the preliminary round, the top four of each pool, were admitted to the "top 16", also divided into 4 pools. The top two of each pool were admitted to the quarter finals.

Châteaurenard, Saint-Paul lès Dax, Cannes and Tyrosse were the newcomers.

Le Toulouse won the title beating Castres in the final. It was their 12th French Championship. In this year Toulouse did the double winning the Challenge Yves du Manoir.

At the end of the season the first division of the French Championship reduced to 20 clubs, relegating Auch, Châteaurenard, Graulhet, Périgueux, Tarbes, Saint-Paul les Dax, Biarritz, Avenir Valencien, Cannes, Stade bordelais, Dijon and Tyrosse, to second division.

Preliminary round

"Top 16""
The first two of each pool to "last of 8" round

Last 8

Semifinals

Final

Notes 

French Rugby Chanmpionship
French rugby union championship
Championship